Jack and the Beanstalk is a 1902 American silent short film directed by George S. Fleming and Edwin S. Porter.

Plot summary 
In this earliest known adaptation of the classic fairy tale, Jack first trades his cow for the bean. His mother then makes him drop them in the front yard, and go to his room. As he sleeps, Jack is visited by a fairy who shows him glimpses of what will await him when he ascends the bean stalk. In this version, Jack is the son of a deposed king.

When Jack wakes up, he finds the beanstalk has grown and he climbs to the top where he enters the giant's home. The giant finds Jack, who narrowly escapes. The giant chases Jack down the bean stalk, but Jack is able to cut it down before the giant can get to safety. He falls and is killed. Jack celebrates. The fairy then reveals that Jack may return home as a prince.

Cast

External links 

 

1902 films
1900s fantasy adventure films
Films set in the Middle Ages
American fantasy adventure films
American silent short films
1900s English-language films
American black-and-white films
Films based on Jack and the Beanstalk
Films directed by Edwin S. Porter
Articles containing video clips
1900s American films
Silent adventure films
Silent horror films